Adela cuprella is a moth of the family Adelidae and are found in most of Europe. It was first described by Michael Denis & Ignaz Schiffermüller in 1775 and the type locality is from Austria. They can be found flying around sallows (Salix) species during the day in April and May.

Description

The wingspan is 14–17 mm. The forewings are bronzy metallic with a purplish sheen and towards costa purple-tinged. Hindwings are dark purplish-fuscous. The head in males is black, in female ferruginous, the face in females is hairy. Antennae in males is 2.5, white, towards the base blackish ringed; in females it is I.25 black and not thickened towards apex white.
  

Adults are active by day and are on wing from mid April to early May, flying around willows.

Life cycle
The moths are univoltine (i.e. one generation a year) and visit the flowers of sallows, usually high up. In some years, they can be numerous and in other years, scarce or absent. The females lay their eggs on the catkins of sallows. On hatching, the larvae drop to the ground and feed on dead leaf litter from a flat, portable case built from leaf fragments. The case is an elongate-oval shape with each half made of several, roughly crescentic pieces of dead sallow leaves. The larvae feed from May onwards and can overwinter two or three times. Pupation takes place within the case in March.

Distribution
It is found in most of Europe, except Portugal, Slovenia and most of the Balkan Peninsula.

References

External links
 
 British lepidoptera
 UKmoths

Adelidae
Moths described in 1775
Moths of Europe
Taxa named by Michael Denis
Taxa named by Ignaz Schiffermüller